Godfrey Blow (born 6 October 1948) is an artist based in Kalamunda, Western Australia. He is the founder of the Perth Stuckists.

Life and art

Godfrey Blow was born in North Hykeham, Lincolnshire, England on the same day as fellow Stuckist artist, Eamon Everall. After attending Sheffield Hallam University where he gained a BA Hons degree and Manchester Metro University, where he qualified as a teacher, Blow emigrated to Australia in 1982. Since then he has made his living by teaching and through his artwork. More recently the emphasis has been on his art, as his work has increasingly become a featured part of private and public collections in Australia, including Artbank, The Art Gallery of Western Australia, University of Western Australia and the collections of the cities of Bunbury, Albany and Fremantle.

In 2001 Judith McGrath reviewed his 2001 solo show at The Church Gallery:

He first joined the Stuckists in 2002, when he founded the Perth Stuckists after a conversation with Stuckism founder, Charles Thomson. Since then he has exhibited with the group, most notably in their landmark exhibition, The Stuckists Punk Victorian at the Walker Art Gallery during the 2004 Liverpool Biennial. He is also one of the featured artists exhibiting in the Triumph of Stuckism; an exhibition of new Stuckist paintings curated by Naive John, which comprises part of Liverpool's 2006 Biennial.

His highly finished paintings are worked on over many months, and draw mainly from the often arid and rocky landscape which surrounds his home. In his use of hot, earth colours and crisp detail, he is quintessentially an Australian artist pursuing typically Australian themes. In October 2006, Blow was a finalist in Australia's richest award for landscape painting, the Fleurieu Peninsula Biennale Art Prize.

Exhibitions
Solo Shows.
2014   Harvison Gallery, Landscape, Sea and Beyond, 195 Brisbane Street, Perth
2006	Stafford Studios, "Symbols & Metaphors", Cottesloe, Perth, W.A.
2001	Church Gallery, Claremont, Perth, W.A.
1998	Gomboc Gallery, James Street, Middle Swan, W.A.
1996	Gomboc Gallery, James Street, Middle Swan, W.A.			
1993	The Geraldton Regional Gallery, 24 Chapman Road, Geraldton, W.A.
1992	Lawrence Wilson Art Gallery,"Facing the Dawn", University of Western Australia, Perth, W.A.
1989	Fremantle Arts Centre, Fremantle, W.A.
1986	Quentin Gallery, Claremont, Perth, W.A.
1984	Undercroft Gallery, University of Western Australia, Perth, W.A.
1983	Fremantle Arts Centre, Fremantle, W.A.
	Glyde Gallery, Mosman Park, Perth, W.A.
1980	Hendon Library, Hendon, London, England.
1976	Barnet Arts Centre, London, England.

Collections
The Art Gallery of Western Australia
Curtin University of Technology
City of Bunbury
Artbank
Education Department of Western Australia
Holmes a Court Collection
The University of Western Australia
Sir Charles Gairdner Hospital
City of Fremantle
City of Albany
Sheffield Hallam University
Dr John Collis
Various private collections in Australia, France, India & U.K.

Awards
1984 Bunbury City Invitation Art Purchase Award, WA.
1985 Western Australia Week Invitation Art Award, WA.
1987 Silver Anniversary Art Award, 25th Albany Art Competition, WA.
1987 Highly Commended, Royal Agricultural Society of WA Invitation Art Award, WA.
1993 Highly Commended, The City of Gosnells Art Award, WA.
2002 Cossack Art Award, Category:Painting, WA.
2006 Finalist for The Fleurieu Peninsula Biennial Art Prize for Australian Landscape Painting, South Australia.
2007 Highly Commended, Minnawarra Art Award, City of Armadale, WA.
2007 Mandorla Art Award Finalist, WA.

Books
Germaine, Max "Artists and Galleries of Australia", 1990
Rykes, Graham "A Buyers Guide to Australian Art", 1992
Thorpe, D.W. "Who's Who of Australian Visual Artists", 1995
 Ed. Frank Milner, 2004, "The Stuckists Punk Victorian" National Museums Liverpool,

See also
Stuckism
Stuckism in Australia
Regan Tamanui
The Stuckists Punk Victorian

References

External links
Harvison Gallery website
 Stuckist web site
Godfrey Blow on the Walker Gallery site
Interview with Godfrey Blow, 2005
Godfrey Blow on mungbeing.com
Godfrey Blow web site
Triumph of Stuckism symposium official site
Under The Cover of Romantic Anonymity
Fleurieu Peninsula Biennale Art Prize
Rewarding Art:works by Godfrey Blow.
Godfrey Blow interviewed by Brian Sherwin- myartspace.com

1948 births
Living people
Australian painters
Modern painters
Stuckism
People from North Kesteven District